Meri Awaaz Hi Pehchaan Hai (English: My voice is my identity) is an Indian musical drama television series, which premiered on 7 March 2016 on &TV. It is produced by a brand new production company The House of Originals of Nivedita Basu.

Amrita Rao and Aditi Vasudev along with Deepti Naval and Zarina Wahab played the lead roles. The story showed three generations of two sisters whose lives revolve around music.

The show ended on 15 July 2016 and was replaced by Tere Bin.

Plot 
The story is told by Devika Gaikwad, mother of Kalyani and Ketaki, two sisters who grew together and had the same passion for singing, faced many troubles, struggles, were repeatedly deceived in their personal lives and finally achieved immense success; but later had differences, misunderstandings which led their separation for a good 21 years.

In the last episode they reconcile forgetting the differences and the show ends on a good note.

Cast
 Jannat Zubair Rahmani / Amrita Rao / Deepti Naval as Kalyani Gaikwad
Mehnaaz Maan / Aditi Vasudev / Zarina Wahab as Ketaki Gaikwad
 Pallavi Joshi as Devika Gaikwad aka Aai, Kalyani and Ketaki's mother
 Suhita Thatte as Dadi/Aaji
 Eijaz Khan as Vikrant Khanna
 Rituraj Singh as Sohrab Mistry
 Reshmi Ghosh as Protima Bose
 Aditya Redij as Karan Kapoor
 Bhanu Uday as Rajaram Gaikwad
Anant Jog

References

External links
Official website

2016 Indian television series debuts
Hindi-language television shows
Indian drama television series
Television shows set in Mumbai
&TV original programming
Indian musical television series
Indian period television series
2016 Indian television series endings